Al Jackson (1935–2019) was an American baseball player

Al Jackson may also refer to:
 Al Jackson (basketball) (born 1943), American basketball player
 Al Jackson Jr. (1935–1975), drummer, producer, and songwriter
 Al Jackson (artist) (born 1964), American artist and painter
 Al Jackson (athletics), American hammer thrower
 Al Jackson (defensive back) (born 1971), American football player
 Alcender Jackson (born 1977), American football player
 Alvin B. Jackson, American politician

See also
Alan Jackson (disambiguation)